Dead Rekoning is the third studio album by Kieran Kane. It was released in 1995 on Dead Reckoning Records. The first track, "This Dirty Little Town" features Emmylou Harris and Lucinda Williams.

Track listing

Track information and credits verified from the album's liner notes as well as the Dead Reckoning Records official site.

Personnel
Kieran Kane (vocals, guitar)
Emmylou Harris, Somebody's Darling (vocals)
Dan Dugmore (electric guitar, dobro, steel guitar)
Mike Henderson (acoustic & electric guitars, National steel guitar, slide guitar)
Tammy Rogers (mandolin, fiddle, background vocals)
Fats Kaplin (accordion)
Roy Huskey, Jr. (acoustic bass)
Glenn Worf (bass)
Harry Stinson (drums, background vocals)
Don Heffington (bass bodhran, Egyptian tambourine, tambourine, triangle, percussion)
Lucinda Williams (vocals)

Production
Produced by Harry Stinson & Kieran Kane
Mastered by Hank Williams at Master Mix, Nashville, Tennessee
Mixed by Peter Coleman at Treasure Isle, Nashville, Tennessee
Art direction/Design/Photography by Alan Messer
Additional background vocals by Kieran Kane at Studio By The Driveway

References

External links
Kieran Kane Official Site
Dead Reckoning Records Official Site

1995 albums
Dead Reckoning Records albums
Kieran Kane albums